Georgina Klug (born 11 June 1984) is an Argentine beach volleyball player.

Georgina won the gold medal at the 2015 Pan American Games with Ana Gallay. She represented her country at the 2016 Summer Olympics.

References 

1984 births
Living people
Argentine beach volleyball players
Women's beach volleyball players
Argentine people of German descent
Pan American Games gold medalists for Argentina
Beach volleyball players at the 2015 Pan American Games
Beach volleyball players at the 2016 Summer Olympics
Olympic beach volleyball players of Argentina
Pan American Games medalists in volleyball
Medalists at the 2015 Pan American Games
Sportspeople from Santa Fe, Argentina